Leander is one of the protagonists in the story of Hero and Leander in Greek mythology. 

Leander may also refer to:

People
 Leander (given name)
 Leander (surname)

Places
 Leander, Kentucky, United States, an unincorporated community
 Leander, Louisiana, United States, an unincorporated community
 Leander, Texas, United States, a city
 Leander station, a Capital MetroRail commuter rail station
 Leander, West Virginia, United States, an unincorporated community
 Leander Glacier, Admiralty Mountains, Antarctica

Ships
 , several Royal Navy ships
 Leander class (disambiguation), three ship classes
 HMNZS Leander, a Royal New Zealand Navy light cruiser of World War II, originally HMS Leander of the British Royal Navy
 , several ships

Other uses
 Leander Independent School District, Texas
 Leander High School
 Leander (video game), a 1991 video game
 Leander Club, one of the oldest rowing clubs in the world, based in Henley-on-Thames, England
 LMS Jubilee Class 5690 Leander, a preserved steam locomotive
 Leander (crustacean), a genus of shrimps
 Nottingham Leander Swimming Club